Novasio Ridge is a long, ice-covered ridge separating the lower portions of Freimanis and Man-o-War Glaciers in the Admiralty Mountains. Mapped by United States Geological Survey (USGS) from surveys and U.S. Navy air photos, 1960–62. Named by Advisory Committee on Antarctic Names (US-ACAN) for Richard A. Novasio, U.S. Navy, radioman at Hallett Station, 1957.

Ridges of Victoria Land
Borchgrevink Coast